eGames is an international esports (competitive video gaming) competition based on national teams. The first eGames showcase event took place during the 2016 Summer Olympics in Rio de Janeiro, Brazil at the British House in Parque Lage, Jardim Botânico on 15–16 August. The games were Smite as a show match and Super Smash Bros. for Wii U as a competition.

The eGames is a fully independent organisation and has no association with the International Olympic Committee (IOC) or Olympic Games.

The competition may be defunct, as their news page has not been updated since 2017, and a planned eGames 2018 never emerged.

Editions

eGames
  eGames Rio 2016 (Rio de Janeiro, Brazil) (showcase)

2016 showcase 
In the eGames Rio de Janeiro Showcase 2016, 8 eTeams participated in the eGames.
  (Super Smash Bros. for Wii U)
  (Smite and Super Smash Bros. for Wii U)
  (Super Smash Bros. for Wii U)
  (Super Smash Bros. for Wii U)
  (Super Smash Bros. for Wii U)
  (Super Smash Bros. for Wii U)
  (Super Smash Bros. for Wii U)
  (Super Smash Bros. for Wii U)

Results

See also
 World Cyber Games, similar competition that mirrored the Olympics

References

Department for Digital, Culture, Media and Sport
Recurring sporting events established in 2016
Smite (video game) competitions
Super Smash Bros. tournaments
Defunct esports competitions